Hybomitra cincta is a species of horse flies in the family Tabanidae.

Distribution
Canada, United States.

References

Tabanidae
Diptera of North America
Taxa named by Johan Christian Fabricius
Insects described in 1794